Douglas is an unincorporated community in Fayette County, Iowa, United States. It is located near the junction of County Road B44 and Maple Road, three miles southwest of Eldorado.

History
 Douglas was originally spelled Douglass. The population of the community was 216 in 1902, and was 105 in 1925.

References

Unincorporated communities in Fayette County, Iowa
Unincorporated communities in Iowa